Miltos Andreanidis (born 27 April 1959-14 May 2021) was a Greek professional footballer who played as a midfielder.

Andreanidis died at the age of 62 on 14 May 2021.

References 

1959 births
Living people
Greek footballers
OFI Crete F.C. players
Super League Greece players
Association football midfielders
Footballers from Kilkis